Phytoecia nausicae is a species of beetle in the family Cerambycidae. It was described by Rejzek and Kakiopoulos in 2004. It is known from Greece.

References

Phytoecia
Beetles described in 2004